Sixtus was a Roman name, a corruption of the Greek name "", meaning "polished", and originally Latinized "Xystus". In its Spanish form (Sixto) it is still used as a personal name.

Popes 
Pope Sixtus I (115/116–125)
Pope Sixtus II (257–258)
Pope Sixtus III (432–440)
Pope Sixtus IV (1471–1484)
Pope Sixtus V (1585–1590)

Others 
Sixtus of Reims (d. c. 300), bishop of Reims
Sixtus of Esztergom (d. 1285/86), Hungarian clergyman
Sixtus of Siena (1520–1569), Jewish Roman Catholic theologian
Prince Sixtus of Bourbon-Parma (1886–1934)
Albert Sixtus (1892–1960), German children's writer
Edmund Sixtus Muskie (1914–1996), American statesmen, 58th United States Secretary of State 1980–81
Prince Sixtus Henry of Bourbon-Parma (born 1940)
Sixtus Lanner (1934–2022), Austrian politician
Sixtus Leung Chung-hang (born 1986), Hong Kong activist and politician

See also
Saint Sixtus (disambiguation)
Sixtus Affair

Papal names
Masculine given names